Kangan (English: Bangles) is a 1971 Hindi film starring Mala Sinha and Sanjeev Kumar. The film was a remake of the 1963 Telugu film Eedu Jodu, starring Jamuna, Jaggaiah and Gummadi respectively in the roles of Mala Sinha, Sanjeev Kumar and Ashok Kumar.

Story
Sunil (Sanjeev Kumar) lives a middle-classed lifestyle in a village in India along with his widowed mom, Janki. He is studying Medicine in the city and is in love with his childhood sweetheart, Shanta (Mala Sinha).

Music
Music given by Kalyanji-Anandji and lyrics written by Anjaan and Verma Malik.
"Sataye Sari Raina Kunwaare Kangana" - Lata Mangeshkar
"Jhuke Jo Tere Naina" - Mahendra Kapoor, Usha Khanna
"Prabhu Ji Mere Avagun Chit Naa Dharo" - Ashok Kumar
"Puncture, Yeh Duniya Motor Gadi hai, Koi Chale Na Janter Manter" - Mohammed Rafi, Mehmood

References

External links

1971 films
Films scored by Kalyanji Anandji
1970s Hindi-language films
Indian drama films
Hindi remakes of Telugu films
1971 drama films
Hindi-language drama films